Albert "Max" Abramson (born April 29, 1976) is an American politician currently serving as a member of the New Hampshire House of Representatives, representing Rockingham District 37 (Hampton Falls, Seabrook) since 2018. He previously represented the same district from 2014 to 2016. He ran for the nomination of the Libertarian Party for the 2020 presidential election, but dropped out on March 3, 2020.

Abramson was the Libertarian nominee for Governor of New Hampshire in 2016. He sought the Veterans Party nomination for President but lost.

Career 
In 2010, Abramson was a candidate in the Republican primaries for the New Hampshire House of Representatives, Rockingham District 14, but lost narrowly.

Following his resignation from the Seabrook Planning Board and Budget Committee, Abramson announced a run for the position of the Rockingham County attorney's office as a Libertarian, remarking that the office was "overstaffed" and was not investigating "violence, sexual misconduct, and theft by police officers".

Abramson was elected to the New Hampshire House of Representatives, as a Republican, representing Rockingham, District 20 in late 2014.

When his appeals of the 2010 "reckless conduct" failed and the charges discovered, he was removed from the House Criminal Justice and Public Safety Committee by Republican House Speaker Shawn Jasper.

In May 2016, Abramson announced that he had changed his party registration from Republican to Libertarian. In September, he was nominated as the Libertarian Party of New Hampshire's candidate for Governor of New Hampshire in the 2016 gubernatorial election, garnering 4.3% of the popular vote. Abramson's campaign, buoyed by Gary Johnson's campaign, won major party status and automatic ballot access for the Libertarian Party of New Hampshire for the first time in 20 years.

Following the 2016 election, Abramson switched back to the Republican Party and was re-elected in 2018 to the seat he previously held in the Legislature.

In 2022, Abramson was one of 13 Republicans to vote for a constitutional amendment to secede New Hampshire from United States.

In 2022, Abramson opposed New Hampshire legislation that would allow homeowners to add up to four housing units on lots that were previously exclusively zoned for single-family housing.

2020 presidential campaign 
Following the 2018 election, Abramson announced his return to the Libertarian Party to campaign for the 2020 Libertarian presidential nomination.

Abramson officially announced his campaign for president under the Libertarian banner on June 30, 2019, two days after again leaving the Republican Party, and becoming an independent. During his campaign, Abramson was the only incumbent elected official running for the Libertarian nomination, however, he never actually joined the Libertarian Party. He stated that his primary campaign platform was to bring troops home and cut the national debt. Moreover, the goal of Abramson's campaign was not "necessarily" to win the presidency, but to elect as many Libertarians to legislature seats as possible. Abramson quit the Libertarian Primary on March 3, 2020, subsequently ending his bid for the Libertarian presidential nomination.

On June 8, Abramson asked the Veterans Party of America for their presidential nomination, but they did not hold a national convention for 2020. He also later announced a run for the nomination of the Reform Party. Abramson attempted to organize a merger between the two parties, which was negatively reacted to by Reform Party leadership. Abramson finished a distant second to Rocky De La Fuente at the Reform Party Convention on June 20. On August 22, Abramson announced on Twitter that The Veteran's Party of America decided not to hold a convention or run a candidate for the 2020 presidential election, effectively ending his 2020 presidential run. He decided to run as a Republican for the New Hampshire House of Representatives from District 37 of Rockingham County.

Legal issues 
On December 19, 2010, Abramson was arrested after firing a gun into his backyard to breakup a fight. Abramson raised a claim of self defense and claimed he did this to prevent someone from getting stabbed in a fight happening inside his home. At the time, Abramson was a member of the Seabrook Planning Board and Budget Committee. In March 2012, he was convicted of felony reckless conduct for the incident. He was found guilty of one felony charge of reckless conduct and sentenced to one years' suspended sentence, 262 hours of community service. He resigned from the Planning Board on July 17, 2012.

Years later in 2015, as an elected assemblyman the charges surfaced and he was removed from the House Criminal Justice Committee by Speaker Shawn Jasper.

Electoral history

Notes

References

External links 
 
 Campaign site

1976 births
Living people
American government officials convicted of crimes
American libertarians
Candidates in the 2020 United States presidential election
People from Kent, Washington
People from Seabrook, New Hampshire
Members of the New Hampshire House of Representatives
New Hampshire Libertarians
New Hampshire politicians convicted of crimes
New Hampshire Republicans
New Hampshire Democrats
Candidates in the 2016 United States elections
21st-century American politicians
Libertarian Party (United States) officeholders